The Fall of Man is a painting of the Fall of Man or story of Adam and Eve by the Venetian artist Titian, dating to around 1550 and now in the Prado in Madrid. It is influenced by Raphael's fresco of the same subject in the  Stanza della Signatura in the Vatican, which also had a seated Adam and standing Eve, as well as Albrecht Dürer's engraving Adam and Eve for smaller details. Owned at one point by Philip II of Spain's secretary, Antonio Pérez, and perhaps first commissioned by his father, in 1585 it entered the Spanish royal collection, where it was copied by Rubens between 1628 and 1629 for his own version of the subject.

References
Prado online page, version of Falomir, M.: Tiziano, Museo Nacional del Prado, 2003, pp. 396-397

Paintings by Titian in the Museo del Prado
Paintings depicting Adam and Eve
Nude art
1550 paintings
Foxes in art